Ascensão e Queda de um Paquera is a 1970 Brazilian comedy film directed by Victor di Mello and starring Cláudio Cavalcanti.

Cast
Cláudio Cavalcanti
Mário Benvenutti
Dilma Lóes as Claudia
Valentina Godoy
Henriqueta Brieba
Urbano Lóes
Kleber Santos
Monique Lafond

External links
 

1970 films
Brazilian comedy films
1970s Portuguese-language films
1970 comedy films